In vehicle dynamics, a tire model is a type of multibody simulation used to simulate the behavior of tires. In current vehicle simulator models, the tire model is the weakest and most difficult part to simulate.

Tire models can be classified on their accuracy and complexity, in a spectrum that goes from more simple empirical models to more complex physical models that are theoretically grounded. Empirical models include Hans B. Pacejka's Magic Formula, while physically based models include brush models (although they are still quite simplified), and more complex and detailed physical models include RMOD-K, FTire and Hankook. Theoretically-based models can be in turn classified from more approximative to more complex ones, going for example from the solid model, to the rigid ring model, to the flexural (elastic) ring model (like the Fiala model), and to the most complex ones based on finite element methods.

Brush models were very popular in the 1960s and '70s, after which Pacejka's models became widespread for many applications.

Classification by purpose

Driving dynamics models
 Brush model (Dugoff, Fancher and Segel, 1970)
 Hohenheim tire model (physical approach [1] )
 Pacejka Magic Formula Tire (Bakker, Nyborg and Pacejka, 1987)
 TameTire (semi-physical approach)
 TMeasy (semi-physical approach)
 Stretched string tire model (Fiala 1954)

Comfort models
BRIT (Brush and Ring Tire)
CDTire (Comfort and Durability Tire)
Ctire (Comfort tire)
Dtire (Dynamical Nonlinear Spatial Tire Model)
 FTire (Flexible Structure Tire Model)
 RMOD-K (Comfort and Durability Tire)
 SWIFT (Short Wavelength Intermediate Frequency Tire) (Besselink, Pacejka, Schmeitz, & Jansen, 2005)

Applications
Fully physics-based tire models have been typically too computational expensive to be run in realtime driving simulations. For example, to since CDTire/3D, a physics-based tire model, cannot be run in realtime, for realtime applications typically an equivalent semi-empirical "magic formula" type of model, called CDTire/Realtime, is derived from it through experiments and a regression algorithm. 10th International Munich Chassis Symposium 2019 (pp. 753-774). Springer Vieweg, Wiesbaden.

In 2016, a slightly less accurate version of FTire, a physics-based tire model, was adapted to be run in real time. This realtime version of FTire was shown in 2018 to run on a 2,7 GHz 12 Core Intel Xeon E5 (2014, 22nm process, about $2000), with 900 contact road/contact patch elements, a sample frequency of 4.0 kHz including thermal and wear simulation.

The typical tire model sampling rate used in automotive simulators is 1 kHz. However, running at higher frequencies, like 2 kHz, might mitigate lowered numerical stability in some scenarios, and might increase the model accuracy in frequency domain above 
about 250 Hz.

See also
 Contact patch
 Self aligning torque
 Slip (vehicle dynamics)
 Thermal analysis
 Heat transfer

References

Further reading
 A new way of representing tyre data obtained from measurements in pure cornering and pure braking conditions.
 Hans Pacejka (2012) Tire and Vehicle Dynamics, third edition (first edition 2002)
 Lugner, P., & Plöchl, M. (2005). Tyre model performance test: first experiences and results. Vehicle System Dynamics, 43(sup1), 48-62.
  Xu Wang (2020) Automotive Tire Noise and Vibrations: Analysis, Measurement and Simulation, ch.10
 FTire physical tire model to run with rFpro driving simulation software, at rFpro official Vimeo and youtube channels, Jan 29, 2020
 Romano, L., Bruzelius, F., & Jacobson, B. (2020) Brush tyre models for large camber angles and steering speeds, in Vehicle System Dynamics, 1-52.
 VEHICLE DYNAMICS LIBRARY OFFERS EXPANDED SUPPORT FOR COSIN’S FTIRE MODEL , MODELON, AUGUST 1, 2017
 Février, P., Hague, O. B., Schick, B., & Miquet, C. (2010) Advantages of a thermomechanical tire model for vehicle dynamics, ATZ worldwide, 112(7), 33-37.

External links
Tire models at Project Chrono
Tires For Heavy Trucks by PneusQuebec
Tire Modeling; Extracting Results from a Large Data Set at YouTube

Tires
Automotive software
Driving simulators
Racing simulators
Simulation software
Vehicle dynamics
computational physics
Dynamical systems

de:Reifenmodell